is an anime television series produced by Madhouse based on the Parasyte manga series written and illustrated by Hitoshi Iwaaki. The series follows Shinichi Izumi, a high school boy whose right hand becomes possessed by an alien parasite who calls itself Migi, finding himself in a battle against other Parasites who feast on humans. 

The series aired on NTV between October 9, 2014 and March 26, 2015 and was simulcast by Crunchyroll outside of Asia and by Animax Asia in Southeast Asia and South Asia. The series is licensed in North America by Sentai Filmworks and began airing on Adult Swim's Toonami programming block from October 4, 2015 to April 10, 2016. The opening theme song is "Let Me Hear" performed by Fear, and Loathing in Las Vegas, while the ending theme is "It's the Right Time" performed by Daichi Miura.

The Titles of the first twenty episodes correspond to the titles of published literary works including novels, novellas, plays and poetry.

Episode list

Notes

References

External links
 Official anime website 

Parasyte
Parasyte -the maxim-